In mathematics, the Haynsworth inertia additivity formula, discovered by Emilie Virginia Haynsworth (1916–1985), concerns the number of positive, negative, and zero eigenvalues of a Hermitian matrix and of block matrices into which it is partitioned.

The inertia of a Hermitian matrix H is defined as the ordered triple

 

whose components are respectively the numbers of positive, negative, and zero eigenvalues of H.  Haynsworth considered a partitioned Hermitian matrix

 

where H11 is nonsingular and H12* is the conjugate transpose of H12.  The formula states:

 

where H/H11 is the Schur complement of H11 in H:

Generalization 

The formula does not hold if H11 is singular.

Carlson, Haynsworth and Markham also gave sufficient and necessary conditions for equality to hold.

See also 
 Block matrix pseudoinverse
 Sylvester's law of inertia

Notes and references 

Linear algebra
Matrix theory
Theorems in algebra